The Radar for Europa Assessment and Sounding: Ocean to Near-surface (REASON) is a multi-frequency, multi-channel ice penetrating radar system that will be flown on board the Europa Clipper mission to Jupiter's moon Europa. REASON investigation will provide the first direct measurements of Europa's ice shell surface character and subsurface structure.

Overview

The REASON instrument makes innovative use of radar sounding, altimetry, reflectometry, plasma and particles analyses. These investigations will use a dual-frequency radar emitting HF (9 MHz) and VHF (60 MHz) with concurrent shallow and deep sounding. Both VHF and HF radiating elements are mounted on a single boom, reducing antenna
mass. The mission plan also includes using REASON as a nadir altimeter capable of measuring tides to test ice shell and ocean hypotheses as well as characterizing roughness across the surface to identify potential landing sites for a future Europa Lander.

The REASON instrument will also be able to spot pockets of water within the ice shell that could serve as a passageway for chemicals on the moon's surface to the ocean below — an environment where life could potentially develop.

The instrument was developed by the Jackson School of Geosciences, and its Principal Investigator is Donald Blankenship.  REASON will be fabricated by engineers from NASA's Jet Propulsion Laboratory and the University of Iowa.

Specifications table

Objectives

The scientific objectives of the REASON investigation are: 
Characterize the distribution of any shallow subsurface water
Search for an ice-ocean interface and characterize the ice shell's global structure
Investigate the processes governing material exchange among the ocean, ice shell, surface, and atmosphere
Constrain the amplitude and phase of gravitational tides
Characterize scientifically compelling sites, and hazards, for a potential future Europa Lander mission

References

Spacecraft instruments
Europa (moon)
Europa Clipper